On June 10, 2022, a group of men assaulted four women at a barbecue restaurant in Lubei District, Tangshan. Before dawn, a drunk man named Chen Jizhi (陈继志) attempted to sexually harass a woman, when the act was met with resistance, Chen Jizhi became angry and along with several of his companions, violently assaulted the four women. The surveillance footage was circulated on the Internet soon after the incident, causing  extensive discussions on multiple social media platforms in China. People's Daily said it was not only a crime, but also challenged the public's sense of security. At the same time, it also sparked discussion about women's rights in China. After the incident was uploaded on the Internet, there were several real-name reports of Tangshan-related gangs, which also received some attention.  On June 10, two suspects were arrested and all nine suspects were arrested the following day.

On June 11, according to the official Weibo news of the Langfang Public Security Bureau, according to the jurisdiction designated by the Provincial Public Security Department, the case was investigated and handled by the Guangyang Branch of the Langfang Public Security Bureau.

Attack
At the time of the incident, the suspect, a man in his forties, entered the barbecue shop and sexually harassed a young woman who was having barbecue with her friends.  The woman's attempt of self-defense was met with violence. Seeing her friend assaulted, one of the women smashed a bottle on the head of the assailant.  At which time, some of the assailant's companions left their outside dining seats and joined in on the assault. The store owner, a woman in her sixties attempted to break apart the fight vocally, but was only able to move the fight outside as the targeted  girl was dragged outside by her hair and continually assaulted in the form of kicking and punching, focusing mostly on the head area. There was a count of 7 or 8 beer bottles having been smashed on her head.   During the time, other women dining in the barbecue restaurant were about to rescue the beaten woman, but they were all assaulted by the group as other men watched. These battered woman were left with serious head injuries. After the incident, nine suspects fled the scene. According to official reports, on June 10, the four victims were treated for injuries at the Affiliated Hospital of North China University of Science and Technology, and the condition of two of them were listed as stable and non-life-threatening, and they were said to have left the hospital prior to this announcement; two women were hospitalized for treatment, and the hospital stated that one of the two suffered serious mouth injuries and lost several teeth. On the afternoon of June 11, all the suspects were arrested. On the same day, the reporter noticed that the barbecue restaurant was closed.

Official response
On the evening of June 10, the Tangshan Public Security Bureau Lubei Branch released news that the two suspects involved in the case were arrested. In the early hours of June 11, three more people involved in the case were arrested. With the assistance of the Jiangsu police, three people involved in the case were arrested at a checkpoint on the morning of June 11. In the afternoon of June 11, the last person involved in the case was arrested. So far, all nine persons involved in the case have been arrested.
According to the civilisation office of the Communist party of China’s central committee, Tangshan lost its title of "national civilized city" on 22 June 2022.

In addition, police in many parts of China conduct summer night patrols, focusing on barbecue stalls and barbecue restaurants.

Approved arrest
Ten suspects, approved by the People's Procuratorate of Guangyang District, Langfang City, have been officially arrested by the Guangyang Branch of the Langfang Public Security Bureau.

Victims

On June 12, The Paper was informed that two hospitalized women still needed wheelchairs to enter and exit the ward, but visitation was prevented by hospital staff due to the COVID-19 pandemic. On June 13, a reporter went to the hospital of the North China University of Technology where the battered women were treated to probe the treatment of the injured women, and hospital staff said that the four battered girls, two of whom had been beaten, had been transferred from the intensive care unit to the general ward. The two women were also allegedly treated at the hospital's stomatology department after they suffered severe violence to the head. Earlier in the day, there were rumors on Weibo that one of the two beaten women had died, to which the Tangshan Women's Federation said, "(The death is) nothing at all, and there are no sudden circumstances at the moment." The latest they learned in the early hours of the 13th is that the two injured are currently in stable physical condition, and it depends on the specific injuries as to when they will be able to be discharged from the hospital.

On June 21, the Hebei Provincial Public Security Bureau informed that the victims Yuan (female, 24 years old) and Li (female, 29 years old) left on their own after being examined by the hospital without the need for hospitalization; Wang (female, 31 years old) and Liu (female, 29 years old) were hospitalized in a general ward to receive treatment, and their injuries have now improved. The Shanghai Ministry of Justice Institute of Forensic Science issued a forensic opinion on June 20 that the degree of injury to Wang and Liu was minor (Grade 2) and the degree of injury to Yuan and Li was minor. A police officer pointed out that the judicial appraisal of light and minor injuries is different from the general understanding, commonly known as "light injuries are not light, serious injuries are very serious"; according to the appraisal standards, light injuries are injuries that are moderately harmful to personal health.

Related comments
China Women's Daily, People's Daily, China Central Television (CCTV), and Jun Zhengping Studio condemned the incident, and Jackie Chan, Hu Xijin, and others also expressed solidarity with the battered girl.

More than 40 celebrities, including Jackie Chan and Tsui Hark, voiced their support for the battered women. Taiwanese member of South Korean (G)I-DLE, Ye Shuhua, even posted an article on Weibo criticising the perpetrators of the violence as "scum". Zhang Yuqi was criticised for "promoting gender antagonism" when she posted an article criticising the man who did not help in the incident and arguing that "all Chinese men should serve in the military".

Professor Luo Xiang said that the incident, if reported, could involve picking quarrels and provoking trouble and intentional assault.

A Southwest University of Political Science and Law student was given a warning by the university for speaking on the internet about "reviewing victims".

Weibo officially banned 265 accounts for "inciting gender antagonism", and Douyin and Kuaishou also punished the offending accounts. Radio Free Asia has criticised the government's censorship of online opinion on the incident and the news blackout, and accused the information of being opaque. The victim's family and friends have so far not been seen to speak out.

See also
 Women's rights in China

References 

Incidents of violence against women
2022 in China
Tangshan
History of Hebei
Violence against women in China